The Tunisian Women's Basketball Cup or in (Arabic language : كأس تونس لكرة السلة للسيدات) is a women's club basketball competition in Tunisia.
The competition was created in 1966 ruled and managed by the Tunisian Basketball Federation, and since it was held every single year. The dominant Club is Zitouna Sports from Tunis with a total of 13 Cups as a record followed by Stade Tunisien Also from Tunis with 9 Cups, and third rank is CS Sfaxien from Sfax with 7 Cups.

Winners list

Titles by club

References

External links
Basketball Tunisia 
Profile at eurobasket.com

Basketball cup competitions in Africa

Basketball competitions in Tunisia
Recurring sporting events established in 1966
1966 establishments in Tunisia